Book trade may refer to:

Publishing of books
Bookselling, the commercial trade of books